The 1978 AFC Youth Championship was held in Dhaka, Bangladesh from 5 October to 28 October 1978. It also served as qualification for the 1979 FIFA World Youth Championship.

Teams

Group stage

Group A

Group B

Group C

Group D

Knockout stage

Quarter-finals 

Note: Iran had originally won 1-0 against Kuwait, but they were found to have fielded an over-age player; the result was reversed and Iran were ejected from the competition.

Semi-finals

Third place play-off

Final

Results

Qualification to World Youth Championship
The following teams qualified for the 1979 FIFA World Youth Championship.

  (replacing Iraq)
  (host)

References

External links
 

Youth Championship, 1978
Afc Youth Championship, 1978
1978
International association football competitions hosted by Bangladesh
AFC Youth Championship
AFC Youth Championship